Caldwell County is a county located in the U.S. state of Kentucky. As of the 2020 census, the population was 12,649. Its county seat is Princeton. The county was formed in 1809 from Livingston County, Kentucky and named for John Caldwell, who participated in the George Rogers Clark Indian Campaign of 1786 and was the second lieutenant governor of Kentucky. Caldwell was a prohibition or dry county until 2013, when the citizens voted to lift the ban.

History

Caldwell County was formed from Livingston County in 1809.  Prior to that, Caldwell County had been part of Christian, Logan, and Lincoln Counties — Lincoln County having been one of the three original counties of Kentucky.

In the early nineteenth-century, Caldwell County witnessed the passage of the forced migration of the Cherokee to the West on the Trail of Tears during Indian removal. The Cherokee camped for several weeks in Caldwell County during the winter of 1838, mainly at Big Springs, now in downtown Princeton; at Skin Frame Creek, and in the Centerville area near Fredonia.

In 1860, the construction of Princeton College began, but it was delayed by the Civil War. Confederate troops camped on the grounds of Princeton College in 1861, using one of its buildings as a hospital. Following the Confederate retreat in early 1862, however, Union soldiers occupied Princeton for the remainder of the war. In December 1864, raiding Kentucky Confederate cavalry commanded by General Hylan B. Lyon burned the Caldwell County courthouse in Princeton, since it was being used to house the Union garrison.

The expansion of railroads in the late nineteenth century made Princeton an important junction on several major railway lines, most notably the Illinois Central and the Louisville & Nashville.

By the turn of the century, an agricultural boom in Dark Fired Tobacco had made Caldwell County, along with Christian County, a major tobacco-growing area. It was part of what was called the "Black Patch", which used a special process to cure the tobacco. It included about 30 counties in western Kentucky and Tennessee. But the monopolization of the tobacco market by James B. Duke, who formed the American Tobacco Company, forced prices lower, leaving many farmers in debt and discontented.

In response, planters formed the Dark Tobacco District Planters' Protective Association of Kentucky and Tennessee (PPA), to work together in pooling their commodity in order to gain higher prices. They initially used persuasion to urge other farmers to join them.

Under the leadership of Dr. David Amoss of Cobb in Caldwell County, a vigilante force called the Night Riders was formed to strengthen the persuasion. The Night Riders terrorized those who cooperated with the tobacco company by destroying crops, burning warehouses, and attacking individuals. The Night Riders took over Princeton one night in December 1906, burning all of the Duke tobacco warehouses. They raided other towns, conducting similar raids and destroying resources. The "Black Patch Wars" came to an end around 1908, finally suppressed with the aid of the Kentucky state militia.

Since 1925, Caldwell County has housed the University of Kentucky Research and Education Center, a campus of the University of Kentucky's College of Agriculture. The "UKREC" in Princeton is a leader in horticultural and biological sciences.

In the mid-twentieth century, Caldwell County began to shift from agriculture to industrialization. Caldwell County is still largely agricultural, but it is also home to factories such as Bremner, the largest private cookie and cracker factory in North America.

Geography

Adjacent counties
 Crittenden County (northwest)
 Webster County (northeast)
 Hopkins County (northeast)
 Christian County (southeast)
 Trigg County (south)
 Lyon County (southwest)

Demographics

As of the census of 2000, there were 13,060 people, 5,431 households, and 3,801 families residing in the county. The racial makeup of the county was 93.89% White, 4.81% Black or African American, 0.15% Native American, 0.16% Asian, 0.01% Pacific Islander, 0.39% from other races, and 0.60% from two or more races.  0.61% of the population were Hispanic or Latino of any race.

There were 5,431 households, out of which 28.50% had children under the age of 18 living with them, 57.10% were married couples living together, 9.80% had a female householder with no husband present, and 30.00% were non-families. 27.50% of all households were made up of individuals, and 14.00% had someone living alone who was 65 years of age or older.  The average household size was 2.36 and the average family size was 2.85.

In the county, the population was spread out, with 22.40% under the age of 18, 7.00% from 18 to 24, 26.30% from 25 to 44, 26.30% from 45 to 64, and 18.00% who were 65 years of age or older.  The median age was 41 years. For every 100 females there were 92.60 males.  For every 100 females age 18 and over, there were 89.90 males.

The median income for a household in the county was $28,686, and the median income for a family was $35,258. Males had a median income of $31,475 versus $20,390 for females. The per capita income for the county was $16,264.  About 12.20% of families and 15.90% of the population were below the poverty line, including 20.40% of those under age 18 and 15.60% of those age 65 or over.

Communities

Cities
 Dawson Springs (mostly in Hopkins County)
 Fredonia
 Princeton (county seat)

Unincorporated communities

 Bakers
 Baldwin Ford
 Black Hawk (partially in Trigg County)
 The Bluff
 Cedar Bluff
 Claxton
 Cobb
 Cresswell
 Crider
 Crowtown
 Dulaney
 Enon
 Farmersville
 Flat Rock
 Friendship
 Fryer
 Harper Ford
 Hopson
 Lake Shore
 Lewistown
 McGowan
 Midway
 Needmore
 Otter Pond
 Pumpkin Center
 Quinn
 Rufus
 Scottsburg
 Shady Grove
 Smith Ford
 Tom Gray Ford
 White Sulphur

Politics

Education
School districts include:
 Caldwell County School District
 Dawson Springs Independent School District

See also

 National Register of Historic Places listings in Caldwell County, Kentucky

References

External links
 Caldwell County Website
 Caldwell County Schools
 The Times Leader, Caldwell County Newspaper
 Caldwell County Genealogy
 Some History of Caldwell County

 
1809 establishments in Kentucky
Populated places established in 1809
Kentucky counties